is a private women's junior college in Suginami, Tokyo, Japan.

History

The precursor of the school was founded by Channing Moore Williams and other Anglican missionaries in Yushima, Bunkyo, Tokyo in 1877. In 1882 the school moved to the Tsukiji foreign settlement (today's Akashicho) close to the current site of St. Luke's International Hospital. It relocated to its present site in Suginami, Tokyo in 1924 after the Great Kantō earthquake.

Named in honor of St. Margaret of Scotland, the college remains closely affiliated with the Anglican Church in Japan. It was chartered as a two-year junior college in 1967.

Academics
There are two main academic departments focusing on programs in Contemporary Communication and Early Childhood Education.

Campus
The site in Suginami-ku shares extensive grounds, sports, chapel and modern performance facilities with St. Margaret's girls primary, junior and senior high schools. The construction of the historic St. Margaret's Chapel dedicated in 1932 was financed by the Woman's Auxiliary of the Episcopal Church.

See also
Nippon Sei Ko Kai
Channing Moore Williams
Rikkyo University

References

External links 
 St. Margaret's Junior College Website
 St. Margaret's Schools Website

Christian universities and colleges in Japan
Private universities and colleges in Japan
Educational institutions established in 1877
Anglican Church in Japan
Universities and colleges in Tokyo
Women's universities and colleges in Japan
Japanese junior colleges
1877 establishments in Japan